Simbakubwa ("great lion") is an extinct genus of hyainailourid hyaenodonts from paraphyletic subfamily Hyainailourinae that lived in Kenya during the early Miocene.

Etymology
The name of this genus comes from Swahili language for "great lion". Species name Simbakubwa kutokaafrika means "great lion of Africa".

Description

The fossils of Simbakubwa were first discovered by rural Kenyans at Meswa Bridge, Western Kenya. Thereafter Matthew Borths and Nancy Stevens published the findings after examining the fossils which had been stored at the Nairobi National Museum in Kenya for decades. The type specimen consists of a mandible from the lower jaw, a right upper maxilla and some postcranial remains. The light wear patterns on the dentition indicate that the holotype specimen was a young adult at the time of its death. The study of the postcranial remains indicates Simbakubwa was possessed of a semi-digitigrade walking stance.

Paleoecology 
Simbakubwa, like other hyainailourids, probably was a specialist hunter and scavenger that preyed on creatures such as rhinoceroses and early proboscideans. It may have been somewhat less specialized in crushing bone than its later relatives such as Hyainailouros. However, like Hyainailouros, Simbakubwa possessed lingually rotating carnassial blades, ensuring a constant shearing edge throughout its life.

Phylogeny
The phylogenetic relationships of genus Simbakubwa are shown in the following cladogram:

See also
 Mammal classification
 Hyainailourinae

References

Hyaenodonts
Fossil taxa described in 2019
Miocene mammals of Africa
Prehistoric placental genera
Prehistoric monotypic mammal genera